Prem Kahani may refer to:

 Prem Kahani (1937 film), 1937 Hindi film
 Prem Kahani (1975 film), 1975 Hindi film
 Prem Kahani (2009 film), 2009 Kannada film